Imitations of Life is the fourth studio album by American R&B/pop group, H-Town. It was released September 27, 2004, on H-Town Music.  This was the final album to feature the group's lead singer, Keven Conner (better known as Dino), who died on January 28, 2003, a year prior to the album's release.

Track listing

 "Nothin in Common (Intro)" - 0:53
 "Nothin in Common" - 4:36
 "Let's Just Make It" - 5:29
 "My Pink Sky" - 5:16
 "Back Home to Lovin' You" (Pat Rodriguez, Shazam Conner) - 3:35
 "Strip Club Junkies" - 3:22
 "The Thrill Is Gone" - 3:27
 "Here We Go Again" - 3:58
 "Cryin' Out My Heart to You" - 6:05
 "Feel Like Fire" - 3:54
 "Sex Dance" - 4:49
 "More Ways to Love a Woman" - 4:09
 "Stop Living in Color" - 3:45
 "Unpredictable" - 3:15
 "She's Actin' Bad" (featuring CiChe, MC Quake, Big Mike) - 4:09
 "Slow and Easy" (featuring Zapp) - 2:56

Personnel
Composer – Keven "Dino" Conner
Composer – Solomon "Shazam" Conner
Guest Artist – Big Mike
Guest Artist – M.C. Quake,  
Guest Artist – Roger Troutman
Guest Artist – CiChe
Background vocals – Black Friday
Engineer, Mixing – Gerry Gallegos (Gerry G).
Mixing, Producer – Gold Finger
Composer, Producer – Pat Rodriguez

credits are from album liner notes.

References

External links
Imitations of Life (CD, Album) | Discogs
"Imitations of Life - H-Town" | Allmusic

2004 albums
H-Town (band) albums